Going Down is a remix album by the English electronic group Client. It was released in 2004 by Toast Hawaii as a download-only release on the band's website.

The album collected various remixes for the singles from the Client album. The remixes were culled mainly from the 12" singles released.

Track listing
All songs written by Client.

"Price of Dub" – 3:41
"Price of Love" (Extended Mix) – 5:04
"Client" (Harder Sex Mix) – 6:22
"Price of Love" (Sie Medway-Smith Mix) – 4:57
"Rock and Roll Machine" (Extended Mix) – 5:25
"Rock and Roll Machine" (Sie Medway-Smith Mix) – 5:21
"Rock and Roll Machine" (Droyds Mix) – 6:29
"Here and Now" (Cicada Vocal Mix) – 7:05
"Here and Now" (Extended Mix) – 5:24

References

2004 remix albums
Client (band) albums
Toast Hawaii (record label) remix albums